Nedelchev, female form Nedelcheva, is a Bulgarian surname.

Notable people with this surname include:
 Deyan Nedelchev, Bulgarian pop singer
 Iliyan Nedelchev, Bulgarian footballer
 Mariya Gabriel (née Nedelcheva), Bulgarian politician
 Petya Nedelcheva, Bulgarian badminton player
 Radi Nedelchev, Bulgarian artist 
 Stefan Nedelchev, Bulgarian footballer 
 Yonko Nedelchev, Bulgarian footballer

Bulgarian-language surnames